Felimida elegantula is a species of colourful sea slug, a dorid nudibranch, a marine gastropod mollusc in the family Chromodorididae.

References

Chromodorididae
Gastropods described in 1844